The Sixth Buddhist Council was a general council of Theravāda Buddhism, held in a specially built Mahā Pāsāṇa Guhā (Great Cave) and pagoda complex at Kaba Aye Pagoda in Yangon, Burma. The council was attended by 2500 monastics from eight Theravādin Buddhist countries.  The Council lasted from Vesak (Visākha) 1954 to Vesak 1956, its completion coinciding with the traditional 2500th anniversary of the Gautama Buddha's Parinibbna.  In the tradition of past Buddhist councils, a major purpose of the Sixth Council was to preserve the Buddha's teachings and practices as understood in the Theravadin tradition.

Over the two-year period, monks from different countries recited from their existing redaction of the Pāli Canon and the associated post-canonical literature.  As a result, the Council synthesized a new redaction of the Pali texts ultimately transcribed into several native scripts.

Timing and participants

The Council was convened 83 years after the Burmese Fifth Buddhist council was held in Mandalay.  The Council commenced proceedings on Vesak, 17 May 1954, in order to allow sufficient time to conclude its work on Vesak, 24 May 1956, the day marking the 2500-year celebration of Gautama Buddha's Parinibbāna according to traditional Theravada dating.

The Sixth Council was sponsored by the Burmese Government led by Prime Minister U Nu. He authorized the construction of the Kaba Aye Pagoda and the Mahāpāsāṇa Guhā or "Great Cave" in which the work of the council took place. This venue was designed to be like the cave in which the First Buddhist council was held.

As in the preceding councils, the Sixth Council's aim was to affirm and preserve the genuine Dhamma and Vinaya. The 2500 participating Theravādan Elders came from eight different countries: Burma, Thailand, Cambodia, Laos, Vietnam, Sri Lanka, India, and Nepal. A temple in Japan also sent delegates. The only Western monks to participate were German-born, Sri-Lanka-residing Nyanatiloka Thera and Nyanaponika Thera.

Mahasi Sayadaw was appointed to ask the required questions about the Dhamma to Mingun Sayadaw, who answered them.

Resultant texts
By the time this council met all the participating countries had had the Pali Tipiṭaka rendered into their native scripts, with the exception of India.  During the two years that the Council met, the Tipiṭaka and its allied literature in all scripts were painstakingly examined with their differences noted down, the necessary corrections made, and collated. Not much difference was found in the content of any of the texts. Finally, after the Council had officially approved the texts, all of the books of the Tipiṭaka and their commentaries were prepared for printing on modern presses. This notable achievement was made possible through the dedicated efforts of the 2500 monks and numerous lay people. Their work came to an end with the rise of the full moon on the evening of 24 May 1956, the 2500th anniversary of the Buddha's Parinibbāna according to the traditional Theravada dating.

This Council's work was a unique achievement in Buddhist history.  After the scriptures had been examined thoroughly several times, they were put into print, covering 52 treatises in 40 volumes. At the end of this Council, all the participating countries had the Tipiṭaka rendered into their native scripts except India.

Dhamma Society Fund 6th Buddhist Council Tipitaka Edition
Since the year 1999, the Dhamma Society Fund in Thailand has been revising the 1958 Sixth Council Edition with other editions to remove all printing and editorial errors.   This romanized version in 40 volumes, known as the World Tipitaka Edition, was completed in 2005. The 40-volume Tipitaka Studies Reference appeared in 2007.

The Dhamma Society Fund is currently printing the World Tipitaka Edition in Roman Script based on the B.E. 2500 Great International Tipitaka Council Resolution (1958 Sixth Buddhist Council) with sponsorship from the Royal Matriarch of Thailand, Tipitaka patrons and leaders of business community, for distribution as a gift of Dhamma worldwide, with a priority for the libraries and institutes around the world which had received the Siam-script Tipitaka as a royal gift from King Chulalongkorn of Siam over a century ago.

See also
Buddhist councils
First Buddhist council
Second Buddhist council
Third Buddhist council
Fourth Buddhist council
Fifth Buddhist council
Pāli Canon
Sutta Pitaka
Vinaya Pitaka
Abhidhamma Pitaka
List of Sāsana Azani recipients
Tipitakadhara Tipitakakovida Selection Examinations
Tripiṭaka tablets at Kuthodaw Pagoda

References

External links
 Souvenir Album and Photos from Chaṭṭha Saṅgāyana (Pariyatti)
 On-line Chaṭṭha Saṅgāyana edition (VRI)

Buddhist council6
1954 in Asia
1955 in Asia
1956 in Asia
1954 in religion
1955 in religion
1956 in religion
History of Buddhism in Myanmar
20th-century Buddhism
1954 conferences
1955 conferences
1956 conferences